Daniel Barone (21 August 1965, Buenos Aires - ) is an Argentine film and television director.

Although mainly based in work for TV he has directed films such as Cohen vs. Rosi (1998) and Un Amor en Moisés Ville (2001)

Filmography
"Para vestir santos" (2010) TV Series
"Tratame Bien" (2009) TV Series
"Epitafios 2" (2008) MiniSerie HBO
"Mujeres asesinas" (2005)
"Hombres de honor" (2005) TV Series
Locas de amor (2004) TV Series
Día que me amen, El (2003)
Culpables" (2001) TV Series
Primicias" (2000) TV Series
Alma mía (1999)
"Vulnerables" (1999) TV Series
Cohen vs. Rosi (1998)
Comodines (1997) (co-director)
"Verdad consecuencia" (1996) TV Series

External links
 

1965 births
Argentine film directors
Argentine television directors
Living people
People from Buenos Aires